, born  (February 4, 1953), is a Japanese recording artist, composer, record producer, and arranger noted for his electronic-instrumental music, and is often associated with and regarded as one of the most prominent musical acts of new-age music. He won the Grammy Award for Best New Age Album for Thinking of You (1999), with a record 16 nominations in the same category. He received a Golden Globe Award for the original score to Heaven & Earth (1993).

Early life: 1954–76
Masanori Takahashi was born in Toyohashi, Aichi, Japan, and is a graduate of Sahid University.  Kitarō, which is his boyhood name meaning "man of love and joy", a practicing Buddhist himself, was born in a family of Shinto-Buddhist farmers.  After graduating his parents were first opposed to the idea of their son having a musical career.  In an effort to maneuver him towards their vision, they made arrangements for him to take a job at a local company.  In return, he did not show for the job without telling them, and managed to convince them to work on something he loved.

In high school Kitarō played electric guitar in a band that played American rhythm and blues of Otis Redding and covers by The Beatles. After graduating, and learning to play drums and bass, Kitaro moved to Tokyo to experience and become a part of the music scene, and it was there that he discovered the synthesizer.  His first synthesizer was analog, and he recalls having "just loved the analog sound that it made compared to today's digital sound".

In the early 1970s he changed completely to keyboard and joined the Japanese progressive rock band  and recorded four albums with them.  While in Japan and Europe in 1975, he met the German electronica and former Tangerine Dream member Klaus Schulze.  Schulze produced two albums for the band and gave Kitaro some tips for controlling synthesizers. In 1976, Kitaro left Far East Family Band and travelled through Asia (China, Laos, Thailand, India).

Solo career: 1977–present
Back in Japan, Kitaro started his solo career in 1977.  The first two albums Ten Kai and Daichi were released in 1978 and 1979.  He performed his first symphonic concert at the "Small Hall" of the Kosei Nenkin Kaikan in Shinjuku, Tokyo.

Silk Road
The Silk Road: The Rise And Fall Of Civilizations is an NHK Tokushu documentary series that first aired on 7 April 1980, with sequels being broadcast over a 10-year period.  It took a total of 17 years from conception to complete what many consider a landmark in Japan's broadcasting television history.  The intention of the program was to reveal how ancient Japan was influenced by the Silk Road trade route.  The documentary was narrated by Ishizaka Koji with music composed by Kitaro, who insisted that the show be broadcast in stereo.  The music was composed mainly using a Minimoog, Minikorg 700, and Maxikorg DV800.  The score received a Galaxy Award, and the series of soundtracks sold millions of copies.  The success created from the program brought Kitaro international attention.

1984–1993

In 1984, Kitaro embarked on a "Live in Asia" tour. Notably, he was forced to cancel a leg in Singapore because he had long hair and at that time the country had a policy banning it.

He entered into a worldwide distribution arrangement with Geffen Records in 1985–1986. This included a re-releasing of six prior albums entitled Ten Kai (aka Astral Voyage), Daichi (aka Full Moon Story), Millennia, India, Silver Cloud and Live in Asia (aka Asia) (each packaged with Japanesque obi strips) as well as a new album, aptly titled Toward the West. Due to his combination of electronic and acoustic sounds, mellow music, and repeating chords which resembled the umbrella New age music category in the United States and Europe, his music was labeled as "new age". While he's not comfortable with the term, it doesn't mean much to him: "Whether people say my music is new age or not, it's OK with me. I'm just going to keep calling it Kitaro's music". On his music he noted that his outlook on life, study of philosophy, and responsibility to create music which has a good influence on society, influence his musical creation.

In 1987, he collaborated with Mickey Hart of the Grateful Dead for the album The Light of the Spirit (which sold two million copies) and in 1992 with Jon Anderson (Yes) for the album Dream. In 1988, his record sales soared to 10 million worldwide following a successful US tour. He was nominated three times for Grammy Award for Best New Age Album during his tenure at Geffen Records. In 1990 was released studio album Kojiki, which was inspired by the Japense 8th century chronicle Kojiki, and it reached #159 on Billboard 200, and #1 on Billboard New Age albums chart. His soundtrack for the movie Heaven & Earth (1993) won the Golden Globe Award for Best Original Score. Kitaro also produced an album Scenes (1992) released by Shrapnel Records with former Megadeth guitarist Marty Friedman.

1994–present

Domo Records
Since his 1994 debut for Domo Records, and the Grammy-nominated Mandala, Kitaro has released 24 studio albums. Among them, the live An Enchanted Evening (1995), Gaia-Onbashira (1998), and Ancient (2001) were all Grammy nominated. In 1999, Thinking of You won the Grammy for Best New Age Album. Kitaro and Randy Miller's soundtrack album The Soong Sisters (2000) received Best Original Music Award from the Hong Kong Film Award (1998), as well as the Taiwan Golden Horse Film Festival and Award (1997).

Sacred Journey of Ku-Kai series
Kitaro’s music has long been recognized for its messages of peace and spirituality. In the wake of 9/11, during which time the conceptual endeavor, which he envisioned as an artistic means to help unify people globally, the artist began recording Sacred Journey of Ku-Kai (2003), a series of peace-themed albums inspired by the Shikoku Henro Pilgrimage, the travel of Kūkai more than 1100 years ago. The four volumes in the album series were released in 2003, 2005, 2007, and 2011, respectively. Every track on the 4 volumes of Sacred Journey Of Ku-Kai contains samples from ancient Japanese temple bells (Peace Bells) from 88 sacred temples on the island of Shikoku, Japan.

Impressions of the West Lake
In 2007, Kitaro composed the music for Impression West Lake, a large-scale opera, directed by the renowned Chinese film director Zhang Yimou. The opera reflects Hangzhou city’s history and culture through music and dance. Using modern technology, the stage is 75 centimeters below the lake’s surface during the day so as not to affect the landscape and boating activities. In the evening, the stage is a few centimeters below the lake’s surface so actors can walk and perform freely over a surprising water mirror that compose with the lights and colors. The one-hour event had its opening night in March 2007. In 2009, Domo Records released the original soundtrack album Impressions of the West Lake which was nominated for the Grammy in Best New Age Album category.

Recent projects

Kitaro's latest studio album is Final Call, which is a homage to Kitaro's lifetime reverence for nature and was released in September 2013. A year later, in September 2014, his latest live album Symphony Live in Istanbul was released. It was recorded live at the Halic Congress Center in Istanbul, Turkey during Kitaro's Symphonic World Tour, balancing the artist's trademark signature sound and expanding it to new heights with the addition of a 38-piece chamber symphony orchestra. Both Final Call and Symphony Live in Istanbul were nominated for Best New Age Album, becoming Kitaro's 15th and 16th career Grammy Award nominations. More recently he has reissued his critically acclaimed studio albums Kojiki in 2015 and Tenku in 2016.

Touring and other activities
In 2007 to 2009, he launched the "Love and Peace World Tour," an international tour with which Kitaro hoped to inspire his message of world peace with his music. Kitaro toured Southeast Asia in 2007, Greece in 2008 and Hong Kong, Japan, Southeast Asia in 2009. During his visit to Greece, Kitaro met Greek composer Vangelis, and exchanged musical experience and creative ideas.

In 2010, Kitaro performed in Singapore in March, in Mexico for the Zacatecas Cultural Festival in April, in Xi'an, China for the opening event of Daming Palace National Heritage Park in September, in Aichi, Japan, for the Thousand Drums Event at COP10 for the Convention on Biological Diversity in October. From March to April, 2011, Kitaro was on tour titled The Silk Road – East & West, visiting Thailand, Hong Kong, Indonesia, Singapore and Malaysia. He donated part of the CD sales and concert profits to Tōhoku earthquake and tsunami Relief. For the same purpose he participated in the 2011 edition of Musicians United for Safe Energy. In 2012 he released Let Mother Earth Speak, a collaboration album with Native American activist Dennis Banks.

Personal life
From around 1983 to 1990, Kitarō was married to Yuki Taoka, daughter of Kazuo Taoka. They have a son. In the early 1990s, he moved from Japan to the United States. In the mid-1990s, he married Keiko Matsubara, a musician who played on several of his albums. Along with Keiko's son, the couple lived in Ward, Colorado, on a 180-acre (72.85 hectare) spread and composed in his 2500-square-foot (230 m²) home studio "Mochi House" (it is large enough to hold a 70-piece orchestra). Around 2005, they relocated to Sebastopol, California. Kitaro subsequently divorced Keiko (you can see her absence from the performances during 2020-2021 period) and Kitaro married Brazilian artist Franci Shimomaebara on 24th February 2022 in a private ceremony attended by friends and relatives. Both have collaborated in album “Franci- Symphony of my Dreams” where Franci recorded vocal renditions of some of Kitaro’s famous pieces including the Silk Road.

Discography

Studio albums
Tenkai (1978)
Daichi (1979)
Oasis (1979)
Ki (1981)
Silver Cloud (1983)
Toward the West (1985)
Tenku (1986)
The Light of the Spirit (1987)
Kojiki (1990)
Dream (1992)
Mandala (1994)
Peace on Earth (1996)
Cirque Ingenieux (1997)
Gaia-Onbashira (1998)
Thinking of You (1999)
Ancient (2001)
An Ancient Journey (2002)
Sacred Journey of Ku-Kai Vol. 1 (2003)
Sacred Journey of Ku-Kai Vol. 2 (2005)
Spiritual Garden (2006)
Sacred Journey of Ku-Kai Vol. 3 (2007)
Sacred Journey of Ku-Kai Vol. 4 (2010)
Final Call (2013)
Sacred Journey of Ku-Kai Vol. 5 (2017)

Tours
1986:  "Japan Tour" (17 cities)
1987:  "1st North American Tour" (24 cities, 26 shows)
1989:  "1st Europe Tour" (15 cities, 16 shows)
1990:  "Kojiki World Tour" U.S., Japan, Europe (39 cities, 41 shows)
1992:  "Dream World Tour" U.S., Japan, Asia
1992:  "Her Majestry Queen" Sirikit Birthday Anniversary Concert, in Bangkok, Thailand
1994:  "The Kitaro Mandala World Tour" Latin America Tour (4 cities, 6 shows) 
1994:  "The Kitaro Mandala World Tour" The USA Tour (32 shows)
1995:  "Southeast Asia tour" (4 cities, 9 shows) 
1995:  "Kitaro Enchanted Evening Tour" (22 cities, 22 shows)
1997:  "Kitaro's Peace on Earth Holiday Tour" in USA (5 cities, 5 shows)
1998:  "Europe Tour" (13 cities)
1999:  "Kitaro 1999 New Millennium World Tour in USA" (21cities)  
1999:  "Kitaro 1999 New Millennium World Tour in South America"
2000:  "Kitaro Asia 2000" in Malaysia, Singapore, Hong Kong
2002:  "The Silk Road Tour in USA" (6 cities) 
2002:  "The concert for 30th anniversary of diplomatic ties between Japan and China" in China (2 cities)
2004:  "Asia Tour 2004" (7 cities, 8 shows)
2007:  "Love & Peace World Tour 2007" in Philippines, Taiwan, Malaysia, Indonesia, Singapore, Thailand
2008:  "Love & Peace World Tour 2008" in Athens
2009:  "Love & Peace Planet Music Tour 2009" in Malaysia, Singapore, India, Japan, Hong Kong
2009:  "31st Harmony Festival" in Santa Rosa, California
2009:  "Silk Road Arts Festival" in Hong Kong, China
2010:  "Love & Peace Planet Music Tour 2010" in Singapore
2010:  "Zacatecas Cultural Festival" in Mexico
2010:  "Opening Ceremony for 32nd Harmony Festival" in Santa Rosa, California
2010:  "Opening Event of Daming Palace National Heritage Park" in Xi'an, China
2010:  "Thousand Drums Event at COP10 for Convention on Biological Diversity" in Aichi, Japan
2010:  "Asian Art Museum" in San Francisco, California
2011:  "Silk Road East & West Tour" in Bangkok, Hong Kong, Jakarta, Singapore and Malaysia
2011:  "Closing Ceremony for 33rd Harmony Festival" in Santa Rosa, California
2011:  "Opening Ceremony for Musicians United For Safe Energy (MUSE) Benefit Concert" in Mountain View, California
2012:  "Festival International Farosor 2012" in Montevideo, Uruguay
2014:  "Symphonic World Tour 2014"

Awards

Grammy Awards

|-
|  || The Field || Best New Age Performance || 
|-
|  || Kojiki || Best New Age Album || 
|-
|  || Dream || Best New Age Album || 
|-
|  || Mandala || Best New Age Album || 
|-
|  || An Enchanted Evening || Best New Age Album || 
|-
|  || Gaia Onbashira || Best New Age Album || 
|-
|  || Thinking Of You || Best New Age Album || 
|-
|  || Ancient || Best New Age Album || 
|-
|  || An Ancient Journey || Best New Age Album || 
|-
|  || Sacred Journey of Ku-Kai Volume 1 || Best New Age Album || 
|-
|  || Sacred Journey Of Ku-Kai Volume 2 || Best New Age Album || 
|-
|  || Sacred Journey Of Ku-Kai Volume 3 || Best New Age Album || 
|-
|  || Impressions Of The West Lake || Best New Age Album || 
|-
|  || Sacred Journey Of Ku-Kai Volume 4 || Best New Age Album || 
|-
|   || Final Call || Best New Age Album || 
|-
|   || Symphony Live In Istanbul || Best New Age Album || 
|-
|   || Sacred Journey of Ku-Kai Vol. 5 || Best New Age Album || 

Golden Globes

|-
| 1993 || Heaven & Earth || Best Original Score || 

Golden Horse Award (Hong Kong)
Kitaro and Randy Miller won a Golden Horse Award for Best Original Score for the film Soong Sisters in 1997.

Hong Kong Film Award
Kitaro was nominated at the Hong Kong Film Awards for Best Original Film Score for Homecoming in 1985. Kitaro and Randy Miller won a Hong Kong Film Award for Best Original Score for Soong Sisters in 1998.

Japan Gold Disc
Kitaro won a Gold Disc Award in the category of Fusion Instrumental for his album Kojiki in 1991.

See also 
List of ambient music artists

References

External links

Kitaro's Official Website (English)
Kitaro's Official Channel on YouTube

1953 births
Living people
Geffen Records artists
Golden Globe Award-winning musicians
Grammy Award winners
Japanese electronic musicians
Japanese expatriates in the United States
Ambient musicians
New-age synthesizer players
Musicians from Aichi Prefecture
People from Toyohashi
People from Boulder County, Colorado
People from Sebastopol, California
Gramavision Records artists
Domo Records artists